A guide rail is a device or mechanism to direct products, vehicles or other objects through a channel, conveyor, roadway or rail system. 

Several types of guide rails exist and may be associated with:
 Factory or production line conveyors
 Power tools, such as table saws
 Elevator or lift shafts
 Roadways and bridges (in this context sometimes called guardrails)
 A central rail that guides the rubber tired train of a rubber tired metro

Factory guide rail
Most factories use guide rails convey products and component parts along an assembly line. This conveyor system propels products  of various sizes, shapes, and dimensions through the factory over the course of their assembly.

Power tool guide rail
Accessory to a power tool, such as a straight, swivel or angle jig for a circular saw, and can also referred to as a fence.  The guide rail system provides an acute method of cutting material.

Elevator shaft guide rail
Guide rails are part of the inner workings of most elevator and lift shafts, functioning as the vertical, internal track. The guide rails are fixed to two sides of the shaft; one guides the elevator car and the other for the counterweight. In tandem, these rails operate both as stabilization within the shaft during routine use and as a safety system in case of emergency stops.

Roadway guide rail

A guide rail is a system designed to guide vehicles back to the roadway and away from potentially hazardous situations. There is no legal distinction between a guide rail and a guard rail.
Several types of roadway guide rail exist; all are engineered to guide vehicular traffic on roads or bridges. Such systems include W-beam, box beam, cable, and concrete barrier. Each system is intended to guide vehicles back onto the road as opposed to guard them from going off the road into potential danger.

Guide rail versus guard rail
According to the US Federal Highway Administration, "The terms guardrail and guiderail are synonymous, and are used in different regions around the country."  Guide rail and guard rail are intended to steer and "guide" vehicles back onto the road. Since guard rails are designed to keep vehicles safe, and were not designed to guard vehicles from going off the roadway, one could argue that the most technically correct name when referring to road-side rails is guide rail.
According to Cornell University’s Local Roads Program, “Quick Bites” (January 2003), titled Guide Rails: Introduction, “The purpose of guide rail is to protect vehicle occupants from roadside hazards, like drop-offs or fixed objects.”

Locating roadway guide rails
The following quote is from a District 8-0 FAQ, under Right-of-Way (Areas Along Highways & Roads) from Pennsylvania’s Dept of Motor Vehicles, see PA DOT District8 FAQ:
Question: Do I have a location where guide rail is needed?

Answer: Motorists should keep their vehicle on the roadway, driving sensibly in accordance with the PA Vehicle Code; however, this goal is not always realized. Motorists may run off the road for many reasons, including driver error in the form of excessive speed, falling asleep, reckless or inattentive driving, or driving under the influence of alcohol or other drugs. A driver may also have mechanical problems or leave the road deliberately to avoid a collision with another vehicle or object. Guide rail (formerly called guard rail) is only installed when warranted and justified. Guide rail warrants are based on the premise that a traffic barrier should be installed only if it reduces the severity of potential crashes.

Railway guide rail

On the Sapporo Municipal Subway a central rail guides the train. The Lille Metro, Translohr and Bombardier Guided Light Transit are also guided by a central guide rail.

See also

 Automated guideway transit
 Baluster
 Concrete step barrier
 Crash barrier
 Flangeways 
 Guard rail
 Guide bar
 Handrail
 Jersey barrier
 Rubber-tyred metros 
 Rubber-tyred trams

References

Power tools
Safety equipment
Road transport
Rail transport